Henry A. "Heinie" Wiesenbaugh  (March 12, 1914 – September 20, 1965) was an American football running back in the National Football League (NFL) for the Pittsburgh Pirates and Boston Redskins.  He played college football at the University of Pittsburgh.

Early life
Wiesenbaugh was born in Tarentum, Pennsylvania and attended Tarentum High School, where he played high school football.  He then attended The Kiski School in Saltsburg, Pennsylvania.

Football career
After Prep School, Wiesenbaugh attended and played college football at the University of Pittsburgh as a fullback.  In 1932, the Pittsburgh Panthers went undefeated in the regular season, then lost to the USC Trojans in the 1933 Rose Bowl.  He graduated from Pittsburgh in 1935 and then joined the Pittsburgh Pirates of the National Football League (NFL).  He then played for the Boston Redskins before retiring from playing football.  Weisenbaugh then served as a field official for the NFL for several years.

Dentistry
Wiesenbaugh graduated from the University of Pittsburgh School of Dental Medicine in 1938 and established his practice in Tarentum.

Military service
During World War II, Wiesenbuagh served as a captain and dental officer in the 455th Anti-Aircraft Artillery Battalion in Europe.  He later departed the unit and eventually became a major in the Army Medical Corps.

References

External links
 
 
 Funeral Service Announcement

1914 births
1965 deaths
People from Tarentum, Pennsylvania
American football running backs
Players of American football from Pennsylvania
Pittsburgh Pirates (football) players
Boston Redskins players
Pittsburgh Panthers football players